Narciso López Rodríguez (born 18 August 1928) is a Mexican football defender who played for Mexico in the 1954 FIFA World Cup. He also played for CD Oro.

References

External links
FIFA profile

1928 births
Possibly living people
Footballers from Jalisco
Mexico international footballers
Association football defenders
CD Oro footballers
Liga MX players
1954 FIFA World Cup players
Mexican footballers